Meineke may refer to a number of people and organizations:

People
Augustus Meineke (1790-1870), German classical scholar
Christoph Meineke (born 1979), German politician, mayor 
Don Meineke (1930-2013), former professional basketball player who was the NBA's first Rookie of the Year

Other uses
 Meineke Car Care Bowl, a college football bowl game played in Charlotte, North Carolina (2005–2010); now known as the Duke's Mayo Bowl
 Meineke Car Care Bowl of Texas, a college football bowl game played in Houston, Texas (2011–2012); now known as the Texas Bowl
Meineke Car Care Centers, a franchise automobile repair shop chain in North America, Brazil, and China

See also

 
 
 Meineke Car Care Bowl (disambiguation)
 Mineke, a given name